Spiral DRAGNs are a type of galaxy; spiral galaxies which contain DRAGNs (Double Radio-source Associated with Galactic Nucleus), and are therefore also radio galaxies.

Most DRAGNs are associated with elliptical galaxies, as are most double-lobed radio-galaxies. Spiral DRAGNs are inconsistent with currently known galaxy formation processes. As of 2016, there are 6 known spiral DRAGNs that are widely accepted.

Lenticlular galaxies containing DRAGNs are as rare as spiral DRAGNs, with only 5 known examples as of 2020, including: Centaurus A, NGC 612 and NGC 1534.

List

Notes

References

Radio galaxies
Spiral DRAGN list
Lists of galaxies